Unreal Tournament 2004 is a first-person arena shooter video game developed by Epic Games and Digital Extremes. Part of the Unreal franchise, it is the third game in the Unreal Tournament series and the sequel to Unreal Tournament 2003.

Among significant changes to gameplay mechanics and visual presentation, one of the major additions introduced by Unreal Tournament 2004 is the inclusion of vehicles and the Onslaught game type, allowing for large-scale battles.

A sequel, Unreal Tournament 3, was released on November 19, 2007.

Plot 
The game is set in a universe where humans long before fought a war with the Skaarj, leaving their galactic empire in shambles. To assist in the rebuilding of the colonies by calming down enraged colonists, the Liandri Corporation came up with the idea of staging a gladiatorial tournament for the miners. The interest was so high that it grew into a sport, with sponsored teams battling in specially made arenas.

From the very beginning, Xan Kriegor, a robot, reigned as champion in the Tournament, until Malcolm, then leading the team Thunder Crash, defeated him and proceeded to merge with the other popular team at the time – the Iron Guard, led by Brock. In last year's tournament, they were defeated by the Juggernauts, led by gene-boosted monster Gorge.

The game takes place as the Tournament enters its 10th year, Malcolm is back with his old team Thunder Crash and trying to reclaim his title as champion, Brock is back with the Iron Guard and trying for the glory of his own and Gorge and the Juggernauts are there to defend their title. Additionally, the Skaarj Empire has sent a team of their own to the tournament in search of honor and glory and ex-champion Xan Kriegor has had some modifications and is back to return the title where it belongs.

Gameplay 
Unreal Tournament 2004 is a first-person shooter representing a fast-paced extreme sport of the future. The game, designed primarily for multiplayer gameplay, offers multiple ways of movement including double-jumping, dodge-jumping, wall-dodging and shield-jumping. UT2004 also features an extensive array of weapons, all of which come with a secondary fire. Some of them were designed specifically for use in vehicle-based game types, and typically appear only in those game types such as the Anti-Vehicle Rocket Launcher (AVRiL) and the Grenade Launcher. More than 100 maps are included in the game for all new and existing game types.

Gametypes 
The available game types are:

 Assault — An objective-oriented game type in which one team attacks the objectives (usually one at a time in a specific order) while another defends. Often, attackers will be rewarded for completing an objective by being allowed to spawn closer to the next objective. If the attacking team completes the final objective within the allowed time, the teams switch roles and another round on the same map begins. If not, the original attackers lose. If a second round begins and the new attackers complete the final objective in less time than the first attackers, they win; if not, they lose. 
 Onslaught — or ONS is a vehicle-based game mode in which the objective is to capture a series of power nodes connecting the player and their opponents’ bases and destroy the power core located within their base. First team to destroy opponents’ power core wins.
 Bombing Run — Each level has a ball that starts in the middle of the playing field. The player's team scores by getting the ball through the enemy team's hoop. The player scores 7 points for jumping through the hoop while holding the ball and 3 points for tossing the ball through the hoop. The player holding the ball cannot use weapons but can pass the ball to teammates. The ball is dropped if the player is killed. 
 Capture the Flag — The player's team must score flag captures by taking the enemy flag from the enemy base and returning it to their own flag. If the flag carrier is killed, the flag drops to the ground for anyone to pick up. If the player's team's flag is taken, it must be returned (by touching it after it is dropped) before their team can score a flag capture.
 Deathmatch — or DM, is a game type, in which the point is to either reach a certain number of frags (or kills) or to the highest number of frags at the time limit for the match.
 Team Deathmatch — Two teams duke it out in a quest for battlefield supremacy. The team with the most frags wins.
 Invasion — It is a simple survival mode. The players are forced to work together to try and survive endless waves of monsters from Unreal that get increasingly difficult with each wave. Once a player dies they cannot respawn until the round is over. Rounds can either end after a time limit (victory) or when all players are dead (failure).
 Double Domination — The player's team scores by capturing and holding both Control Points for ten seconds. Control Points are captured by touching them. After scoring, the Control Points are reset to neutral.
 Last Man Standing — Each player starts with a limited number of lives. The last remaining player to still have lives wins the match.
 Mutant — All players start in a deathmatch setting with all weapons, and the first player to kill becomes the "mutant". This player receives unlimited ammo, camouflage, Berserk (Increases rate of fire and knockback) and super speed for an indefinite amount of time, but he slowly loses health and can't pick up any health items. When the mutant is killed, the mutant powers are passed to the killer.

Vehicles 
There are many vehicles available in Unreal Tournament 2004. Most of them make an appearance in the Onslaught game type, while a few feature in Assault. The full set consists of aircraft types and vehicles. There are also two spacecraft which only officially feature in one Assault map and different types of gun turrets which players can take control of.

Development

Unreal Tournament 2004 was built with Unreal Engine 2.5 and the content of its predecessor, Unreal Tournament 2003. The game was developed by multiple studios, with Epic Games leading the project. Lead programmer Steve Polge described the role of each company involved:

 Epic Games
 Enhancements to the Unreal Tournament 2003 game types, the new user interface, voice over IP and bot voice command support, engine enhancements and optimizations. They made an improved single-player game, and improved community and demo recording support, in addition to thirty-one new playable characters. A sniper rifle similar to the one included in the original Unreal Tournament was added. They created one Onslaught map, and developed AI support for Onslaught. 16 DM maps, five capture the flag maps, two Double Domination maps and one Bombing Run map were added. The Assault gametype design and implementation were also reintroduced from the original Unreal Tournament.
 Digital Extremes
 Three deathmatch maps, six capture the flag maps, two Bombing Run maps, and three Double Domination maps, two playable characters, a new HUD design; weapon models for the assault rifle, shock rifle, and link gun.
 Psyonix
 The Onslaught gametype design and implementation, with six vehicles, four weapons (grenade launcher, Spider Mine Layer, Anti-Vehicular Rocket Launcher (AVRiL), and the Phoenix Target Painter), and the energy turret. They created seven Onslaught maps, and collaborated with Streamline Studios on the popular map ONS-Torlan. They made the model for the Translocator, a portable teleporter.
 Streamline Studios
 The single-player introduction movie and ONS-Torlan in collaboration with Psyonix. Streamline Studios created the Assault map AS-Confexia as a test for ONS-Torlan, which they released for free.

Release
On February 11, 2004, a playable demo was released for multiple platforms, including Microsoft Windows, OS X, Linux on x86-32 (February 13, 2004) and Linux on x86-64 (February 15, 2004). An updated demo version, including all the bug fixes from official patches and some original content, was released on September 23, 2004.

After being delayed from a late 2003 release, Unreal Tournament 2004 was released on March 16, 2004, for the PC (Linux x86-32/x86-64 and Windows), the Mac OS X version (DVD only) followed on March 31, 2004. The version for Windows x86-64 was released as a downloadable patch on October 1, 2005. At release, consumers could purchase the game on CD, or a limited time special edition DVD version that came with a Logitech microphone headset and a second DVD filled with video-tutorials on how to use the included UnrealEd. A single DVD version with neither the microphone nor tutorials was also released in Europe. The CD version of the game came on six discs. On April 13, 2004, Unreal Tournament 2004 was re-released as a special edition DVD. The game in the United States included a $10 mail-in rebate requiring that a short form is completed and sent to the publisher along with a copy of the manual cover for Unreal Tournament 2003. Versions sold in the United Kingdom had a similar offer but required sending in the play CD for Unreal Tournament 2003 instead.

In summer 2004, Epic and Atari, in collaboration, released an XP Levels downloadable map pack, which included two Onslaught maps, ONS-Ascendancy and ONS-Aridoom. The pack is free for download and use on any system capable of running the game.

On September 21, 2004, Atari released in stores the "Editor's Choice Edition" of Unreal Tournament 2004 which adds three vehicles, four Onslaught maps, and six character skins to the original game, and contains several mods developed by the community as selected by Epic Games. This extension (excluding mods) was released as a Bonus Pack by Atari on September 23, 2004, and is available for free download.

In December 2005, the Mega Bonus Pack was released online by Epic Games, which included several new maps, along with the latest patch and the Editor's Choice Edition content.

In November 2006, Unreal Anthology was released which bundles Unreal Gold, Unreal II: The Awakening, Unreal Tournament (Game of the Year edition), and Unreal Tournament 2004. On March 17, 2008, the game was released standalone and as part of the Unreal Deal Pack on Valve's digital distribution service Steam, followed later in the year by the "Editor's Choice Edition" on GOG.com.

Music
The soundtrack for Unreal Tournament 2004 was composed by Kevin Riepl, Starsky Partridge, and Will Nevins. It contains grand orchestral scores, hard rock, and minimalistic electronic songs. The game also includes almost all tracks from Unreal Tournament 2003.

Modification
Unreal Tournament 2004 includes extensive modification support which allows users to easily create maps, models, game modes as well as various other additions to the game. The game features a flexible modification system which seamlessly blends custom content with the original, as well as allowing for easy tweaking of the game with the "mutator" system.

In 2004, Epic Games held the "Make Something Unreal Contest", which rewarded the creators of the best-submitted modifications with prizes in cash, computer hardware, and, ultimately, a license for commercial use of Unreal Engine 2 and 3. Red Orchestra, a total conversion modification based on the Eastern Front of World War II and focused on realism-oriented gameplay, was the winner of the contest and is currently available as a retail title on Steam.

Alien Swarm was the winner of Phase 4 of the Make Something Unreal Contest for best non-first-person shooter modification. In 2010, the game was released as a standalone game for free, based on the Source engine instead of the Unreal Engine.

Killing Floor was originally a total conversion mod for Unreal Tournament 2004, first released in 2005. The retail release followed on May 14, 2009. Its sequel, Killing Floor 2, was released in 2016.

The developers of the acclaimed 2003 game modification Deathball were awarded grant money from Epic to develop Supraball in 2014.

The game served as a platform for the Computer game bot Turing Test competition, also known as BotPrize.

Reception

Upon release, Unreal Tournament 2004 was met with universal acclaim. Several critics praised the unique, fast-paced, fun and challenging nature of the game as its main selling points, while fans touted the post-release support and extensive modding capabilities. The game holds a score of 94% on GameRankings and a score of 93/100 on Metacritic.

GameSpot named Unreal Tournament 2004 the best computer game of March 2004. It received runner-up placements in GameSpot's 2004 "Best Shooter" and "Best Multiplayer Game" award categories across all platforms, losing to Half-Life 2 and Halo 2, respectively. It was a runner-up for Computer Games Magazines list of 2004's top 10 computer games. However, it won the magazine's "Best Multiplayer" award.

In March 2014, GamesRadar ranked Unreal Tournament 2004 as the 70th best game on their "Top 100 Best Video Games of All Time" list.

Awards

References

External links
 

2004 video games
Atari games
Esports games
Epic Games games
First-person shooters
Arena shooters
Linux games
MacOS games
Multiplayer and single-player video games
Multiplayer online games
Unreal (video game series)
Unreal Engine games
Video game sequels
Video games about death games
Video games developed in Canada
Video games developed in the United States
Video games with user-generated gameplay content
Windows games
MacSoft games
Apple Design Awards recipients